"you are here" is Japanese voice actress and singer Maaya Uchida's 2nd mini album, released on October 2, 2019.

Track listings

Charts

References

2019 EPs
J-pop EPs
Japanese-language EPs
Pony Canyon EPs